This is a list of 213 species in Agromyza, a genus of leaf miner flies in the family Agromyzidae.

Agromyza species

 Agromyza abiens Zetterstedt, 1848 c g
 Agromyza abutilonis Spencer, 1959 c g
 Agromyza abyssinica Spencer, 1964 c g
 Agromyza alandensis Spencer, 1976 c g
 Agromyza albertensis Sehgal, 1968 i c g
 Agromyza albicornis Waltl, 1837 c g
 Agromyza albipennis Meigen, 1830 i c g
 Agromyza albipila Becker, 1908 c g
 Agromyza albitarsis Meigen, 1830 i c g b
 Agromyza alnibetulae Hendel, 1931 c g
 Agromyza alnivora Spencer, 1969 c g
 Agromyza alticeps Hendel, 1931 c g
 Agromyza alunulata Hendel, 1931 c g
 Agromyza ambigua Fallen, 1823 i c g
 Agromyza ambrosivora Spencer, 1969 i c g b
 Agromyza anderssoni Spencer, 1976 c g
 Agromyza animata Spencer, 1973 c g
 Agromyza antennalis Spencer, 1961 c g
 Agromyza anthracina Meigen, 1830 c g
 Agromyza anthrax Williston, 1896 c g
 Agromyza apfelbecki Strobl, 1902 c g
 Agromyza aprilina Malloch, 1915 i c g
 Agromyza aristata Malloch, 1915 i c g b  (elm agromyzid leafminer)
 Agromyza artonia Garg, 1971 c g
 Agromyza audcenti Gibbs, 2004 c g
 Agromyza baetica Griffiths, 1963 c g
 Agromyza basilaris Waltl, 1837 c g
 Agromyza betulae Sasakawa, 1961 c g
 Agromyza bicaudata Hendel, 1920 c g
 Agromyza bicophaga Hering, 1925 c g
 Agromyza bispinata Spencer, 1969 i c g
 Agromyza bohemani Spencer, 1976 c g
 Agromyza brachypodii Griffiths, 1963 c g
 Agromyza brevispinata Sehgal, 1971 i c g
 Agromyza bromi Spencer, 1966 c g
 Agromyza brunnicosa Becker, 1908 c g
 Agromyza buhriella Hering, 1957 c g
 Agromyza burmensis Spencer, 1962 c g
 Agromyza canadensis Malloch, 1913 i c g
 Agromyza catherinae Spencer, 1959 c g
 Agromyza cercispinosa Sasakawa, 2005 c g
 Agromyza ceylonensis Spencer, 1961 c g
 Agromyza chillcotti Spencer, 1969 i c g
 Agromyza cinerascens Macquart, 1835 c g
 Agromyza comosa Spencer, 1962 c g
 Agromyza confusa Spencer, 1961 c g
 Agromyza conjuncta Spencer, 1966 c g
 Agromyza daryalings Singh & Ipe, 1973 c g
 Agromyza demeijerei Hendel, 1920 c g
 Agromyza dipsaci Hendel, 1927 c g
 Agromyza distans Hendel, 1931 c g
 Agromyza diversa Johnson, 1922 i c g b
 Agromyza drepanura Hering, 1930 c g
 Agromyza erodii Hering, 1927 c g
 Agromyza erodii hering , 1927 g
 Agromyza erythrocephala Hendel, 1920 c g
 Agromyza eyeni Spencer, 1959 c g
 Agromyza facilis Spencer, 1969 i c g
 Agromyza felleri Hering, 1941 c g
 Agromyza ferruginosa Van der Wulp, 1871 c g
 Agromyza ferruginosa van-der Wulp, 1871 g
 Agromyza filipendulae Spencer, 1976 c g
 Agromyza flava Sousa, Couri & In Press c g
 Agromyza flaviceps Fallén, 1823 c g
 Agromyza flavipennis Hendel, 1920 c g
 Agromyza flavisquama Malloch, 1914 c g
 Agromyza fragariae Malloch, 1913 i c g
 Agromyza frontella (Rondani, 1874) i c g b  (alfalfa blotch leafminer)
 Agromyza frontosa (Becker, 1908) c g
 Agromyza fusca Spencer, 1963 c g
 Agromyza graminacea Spencer, 1985 c g
 Agromyza graminicola Hendel, 1931 c g
 Agromyza granadensis Spencer, 1972 c g
 Agromyza haldwaniensis Garg, 1971 c g
 Agromyza hardyi Spencer, 1986 i c g
 Agromyza hendeli Griffiths, 1963 c g
 Agromyza hiemalis Becker, 1908 c g
 Agromyza hierroensis Spencer, 1957 c g
 Agromyza hockingi Spencer, 1969 i c g
 Agromyza hordei Spencer, 1961 c g
 Agromyza humuli Hering, 1924 c g
 Agromyza idaeiana Hardy, 1853 g b
 Agromyza igniceps Hendel, 1920 c g
 Agromyza illustris Spencer, 1977 c g
 Agromyza infusca Spencer, 1959 c g
 Agromyza insolens Spencer, 1963 c g
 Agromyza intermittens Becker, 1907 c g
 Agromyza invaria (Walker, 1857) c g
 Agromyza isolata Malloch, 1913 i c g b
 Agromyza johannae de Meijere, 1924 c g
 Agromyza kiefferi Tavares, 1901 c g
 Agromyza kincaidi Malloch, 1913 i c g
 Agromyza kolobowai Hendel, 1931 c g
 Agromyza kumaonensis Sehgal, 1986 c g
 Agromyza kusumae Garg, 1971 c g
 Agromyza lapponica Hendel, 1931 c g
 Agromyza lathyri Hendel, 1923 c g
 Agromyza latifrons Zlobin, 2001 c g
 Agromyza latipennis Malloch, 1914 c g
 Agromyza leechi Spencer, 1969 i c g
 Agromyza leptinomentula Sasakawa, 2005 c g
 Agromyza liriomyzina Zlobin, 1998 c g
 Agromyza lithospermi Spencer, 1963 c g
 Agromyza lucida Hendel, 1920 i c g
 Agromyza lunulata Sasakawa, 1956 c g
 Agromyza luteifrons Strobl, 1906 c g
 Agromyza luteitarsis (Rondani, 1875) g
 Agromyza lutetarsis (Rondani, 1875) c g
 Agromyza lyneborgi Spencer, 1976 c g
 Agromyza malaisei Spencer, 1962 c g
 Agromyza malvaceivora Seguy, 1951 c g
 Agromyza marionae Griffiths, 1963 c g
 Agromyza marmorensis Spencer, 1969 i c g
 Agromyza masculina Sehgal, 1968 i c g
 Agromyza masoni Spencer, 1969 i c g
 Agromyza megaepistoma Sasakawa, 2005 c g
 Agromyza megalopsis Hering, 1933 c g
 Agromyza mellita Spencer, 1977 c g
 Agromyza microproboscis Hendel, 1931 c g
 Agromyza mobilis Meigen, 1830 c g
 Agromyza morivora Sasakawa & Fukuhara, 1965 c g
 Agromyza munduleae (Seguy, 1951) c g
 Agromyza myosotidis Kaltenbach, 1864 c g
 Agromyza myostidis Kaltenbach, 1864 c g
 Agromyza nana Meigen, 1830 c g
 Agromyza nearctica Sehgal, 1971 i c g
 Agromyza nevadensis Spencer, 1981 i c g
 Agromyza nigrella (Rondani, 1875) i c g
 Agromyza nigrescens Hendel, 1920 c g
 Agromyza nigripes Meigen, 1830 i c g
 Agromyza nigrociliata Hendel, 1931 c g
 Agromyza obesa Malloch, 1914 c g
 Agromyza obscuritarsis (Rondani, 1875) g
 Agromyza occulta Waltl, 1837 c g
 Agromyza ocularis Spencer, 1961 c g
 Agromyza oliverensis Spencer, 1969 i c g
 Agromyza oliviae Spencer, 1959 c g
 Agromyza orobi Hendel, 1920 c g
 Agromyza oryzae (Munakata, 1910) c g
 Agromyza pagana Spencer, 1986 i c g
 Agromyza paganella Henshaw, 1989 c g
 Agromyza pallidifrons Spencer, 1959 c g
 Agromyza pallidiseta Malloch, 1924 i c g
 Agromyza panici Meijere, 1934 c g
 Agromyza papuensis Sasakawa, 1963 c g
 Agromyza parca L. i c g b
 Agromyza parilis Spencer, 1986 i c g
 Agromyza parvicornis (Valenciennes, 1836) i c g b  (corn blotch leafminer)
 Agromyza pascuum Waltl, 1837 c g
 Agromyza paucineura Zlobin, 2001 c g
 Agromyza penniseti Spencer, 1959 c g
 Agromyza pennisetivora Spencer, 1961 c g
 Agromyza phragmitidis Hendel, 1922 c g
 Agromyza phylloposthia Sasakawa, 2008 c g
 Agromyza pittodes Hendel, 1931 c g
 Agromyza plaumanni Spencer, 1963 c g
 Agromyza plebeia Malloch, 1914 c g
 Agromyza polygoni Hering, 1941 c g
 Agromyza potenillae (Kaltenbach, 1864) c g
 Agromyza potentillae (Kaltenbach, 1864) i c g
 Agromyza pratensis Waltl, 1837 c g
 Agromyza prespana Spencer, 1957 c g
 Agromyza proxima Spencer, 1969 i c g
 Agromyza pseudoreptans Nowakowski, 1967 i c g b
 Agromyza pseudorufipes Nowakowski, 1964 g
 Agromyza pseudoruifpes Nowakowski, 1964 c g
 Agromyza pudica (G. B. Sowerby I, 1828) i c g b
 Agromyza pulla Meigen, 1830 c g
 Agromyza quadriseta Zlobin, 2001 c g
 Agromyza reptans Fallen, 1823 i c g b
 Agromyza riparia Van der Wulp, 1871 g
 Agromyza rondensis Strobl, 1900 c g
 Agromyza rubi Brischke, 1881 c g
 Agromyza rubiginosa Griffiths, 1955 c g
 Agromyza ruficornis Macquart, 1835 g
 Agromyza rufipes Meigen, 1830 c g
 Agromyza sahyadriae Ipe, 1971 c g
 Agromyza salicina Hendel, 1922 c g
 Agromyza schlingerella Spencer, 1981 i c g
 Agromyza serratimentula Sasakawa, 1992 c g
 Agromyza solita Wulp, 1897 c g
 Agromyza somereni Spencer, 1959 c g
 Agromyza spenceri Griffiths, 1963 c g
 Agromyza spinisera Sasakawa & Fan, 1985 c g
 Agromyza spiraeoidarum Hering, 1954 g
 Agromyza spiraeoidearum Hering, 1957 i c g
 Agromyza stackelbergi Hendel, 1931 c g
 Agromyza subantennalis Sasakawa, 1963 c g
 Agromyza subnigripes Malloch, 1913 i c g
 Agromyza sulfuriceps Loew, 1872 i c g b
 Agromyza susannae Spencer, 1959 c g
 Agromyza tacita Spencer, 1969 i c g
 Agromyza terebrans Bezzi & Tavares, 1916 c g
 Agromyza trebinjensis Strobl, 1900 c g
 Agromyza tularensis Spencer, 1981 i c g
 Agromyza ugandae Spencer, 1985 c g
 Agromyza uniseta Spencer, 1959 c g
 Agromyza uralensis Zlobin, 2000 c g
 Agromyza utahensis Spencer, 1986 i c g
 Agromyza valdorensis Spencer, 1969 i c g
 Agromyza varicornis Strobl, 1900 c g
 Agromyza varifrons Rohwer, 1909 i c g b
 Agromyza venezolana Spencer, 1963 c g
 Agromyza venusta Spencer, 1977 c g
 Agromyza verdensis Spencer, 1959 c g
 Agromyza viciae Kaltenbach, 1872 c g
 Agromyza vicifoliae Hering, 1932 c g
 Agromyza virginiensis Spencer, 1977 i c g
 Agromyza vitrinervis Malloch, 1915 c g
 Agromyza vockerothi (Meigen, 1822) i c g b
 Agromyza wistariae Sasakawa, 1961 c g
 Agromyza woerzi Groschke, 1957 c g
 Agromyza yanonis (Matsumura, 1916) c g

Data sources: i = ITIS, c = Catalogue of Life, g = GBIF, b = Bugguide.net

References

Agromyza